V Soundararajan is an Indian association football manager and former player, who last managed I-League club Chennai City FC.

Playing career
Soundarajan played for Tamil Nadu football team and Railways football team as a midfielder.

Coaching career
Soundararajan is an AFC Professional coaching licence holder. He began his coaching career with India national under-19 football team in 2006. In 2017, Soundararajan was appointed the manager of I-League debutant Chennai City F.C.

References

Living people
Indian football managers
Indian footballers
Footballers from Tamil Nadu
I-League managers
Association footballers not categorized by position
Year of birth missing (living people)
Chennai City FC head coaches